German submarine U-732 was a Type VIIC U-boat of Nazi Germany's Kriegsmarine during World War II. The submarine was laid down on 6 October 1941 at the Schichau-Werke yard at Danzig, launched on 18 August 1942, and commissioned on 24 October 1942 under the command of Oberleutnant zur See Claus-Peter Carlsen.

Design
German Type VIIC submarines were preceded by the shorter Type VIIB submarines. U-732 had a displacement of  when at the surface and  while submerged. She had two shafts and two  propellers.

U-732 was fitted with five  torpedo tubes (four fitted at the bow and one at the stern), fourteen torpedoes, one  SK C/35 naval gun, 220 rounds, and two twin  C/30 anti-aircraft guns. The boat had a complement of between forty-four and sixty.

Service history
Attached to 8th U-boat Flotilla based at Danzig, U-732 completed her training period on 30 April 1943 and was assigned to front-line service.

Imperialist made several attacks, throwing a total of 28 depth charges, but was unable to destroy the U-boat. U-732 managed to dive and lay in 180 meters on the sea ground until the oxygen level and became critically low and the batteries were almost discharged. In the face of the situation, Carlsen decided at 22:30h to order the crew to abandon ship and scuttle the U-boat. Although all crew members made it off U-732, the heavy swell in near total darkness took a heavy toll, only 19 crew members were picked up while 31 perished in the event.

References

Bibliography

External links

World War II submarines of Germany
German Type VIIC submarines
1943 ships
Ships built in Danzig
U-boats commissioned in 1943
U-boats scuttled in 1943
World War II shipwrecks in the Atlantic Ocean
Ships built by Schichau